The Canada–United States Consultative Committee on Agriculture (CCA) is a binational panel of government officials, formed in April 1999, to improve cooperation and discuss differences on issues related to agricultural trade between the two countries. The CCA meets twice yearly.

References 

Canada–United States relations
Agriculture in Canada
Agricultural marketing in the United States